Batchelder is a surname. Notable people with the surname include:

Alice M. Batchelder (born 1944), American attorney and jurist
Charles Foster Batchelder (1856–1954), America ornithologist
Clifton Batchelder (1910?–?), American politician from Nebraska
Ernest A. Batchelder (1875–1957), American artist and professor
Esther Batchelder (1897–1987), American educator and specialist in nutrition
George Washington Batchelder (1826–1910), American politician from Minnesota
George A. Batchelder, American politician from Arizona
Hiram Batchelder (1838–1911), American politician, President of the Chico Board of Trustees, the governing body of the city of Chico, California from 1873 to 1876. 
James Batchelder (died 1854), United States Marshal, killed in the line of duty
John Putnam Batchelder (1784–1868), American physician
Warren Batchelder (1917-2007), American animator 
William F. Batchelder (1926–2019), American jurist, Justice of the New Hampshire Supreme Court 
William G. Batchelder (1943-2022), American politician, Speaker of the Ohio House of Representatives

See also
Batchelder House (Pasadena, California), historic home in Pasadena, California, USA
Batchelder House (Reading, Massachusetts), historic home in Reading, Massachusetts, USA
Mildred L. Batchelder Award an award granted annually by the ALA, it seeks to recognize translations of children's books into the English language, with the intention of encouraging American publishers to translate high quality foreign language children's books and 'promote communication between the people of the world'.
Bachelder